In 2011, as the widely reported protests sparked off by Mohamed Bouazizi's self-immolation in Tunisia began to have a clear impact on the Tunisian government, a wave of self-immolations swept Algeria.  These individual acts of protest mostly took place in front of a government building following an unsuccessful approach to the authorities.  Four self-immolators have died of their burns so far.

It began on 12 January, when 26-year-old Mohamed Aouichia set himself on fire in Bordj Menaiel in the compound of the daira building. He had been sharing a room of 30 square metres with seven other people, including his sister, since 2003; he had repeatedly approached local authorities to get on the social housing list and been rebuffed.  He has so far survived.

On 13 January, Mohsen Bouterfif, a 37-year-old father of two, set himself on fire.  He had gone with about twenty other youths to protest in front of the town hall of Boukhadra in Tebessa demanding jobs and houses, after the mayor refused to receive them.  According to one testimony, the mayor shouted to them: "If you have courage, do like Bouazizi did, set yourself on fire!" His death was reported on 16 January, and about 100 youths protested his death causing the provincial governor to sack the mayor.  However, hospital staff the following day claimed he was still alive, though in critical condition.  Al Jazeera described the suicide as "echoing the self-immolation that triggered the protests that toppled the leader of neighbouring Tunisia."  He finally died on 24 January at a hospital in Annaba.

These suicides were followed by dozens more attempted or successful self-immolations across the country, so far without triggering nationwide demonstrations, most of them after the Tunisian dictator Zine El Abidine Ben Ali fled his country on 14 January; cases included:
 14 January:
 Said H. (26 years old, unemployed bachelor), in front of the Urban Security offices in Jijel; taken to hospital with no visits allowed.
 15 January:
 Senouci Touati (34 years old, unemployed), in Mostaganem - had not heard of the previous Algerian cases; frustrated by what he considered an unjustified discharge from the army without a pension.
 16 January:
 About 20 harraga (would-be illegal emigrants) from Annaba, who attempted to set their boat on fire when approached by the coast guard; the fire was extinguished, but the fate of two of the people on the boat is unknown.
 17 January:
 Maamir Lotfi (36 years old, unemployed father of four), in front of the El Oued town hall; had unsuccessfully asked to meet the governor; taken to hospital with second-degree burns; died on 12 February
 18 January:
 Karim Benidine (35-year-old bachelor said to have mental problems), in front of the town hall in Dellys, critically burned and transferred to hospital.  He died from his burns on 22 January at Douera hospital in Algiers.
 A young man (23 years old), at Berriane in the Sahara; attempted to burn himself in front of the daira office; saved with only light burns on his right foot
 19 January:
 Afif Hadri (37-year-old father of six), in El Oued, saved in time by onlookers.
 G. Seguir (54 years old, blind and handicapped), in M'Sila, covered himself in an Algerian flag and sprinkled himself, his 11-year-old son, and his 8-year-old daughter with petrol while standing in front of the wilaya seat, threatening to set himself and them on fire.  After an hour of tense negotiations with an official, he let the children go and tried to set himself on fire; the onlookers managed to stop the fire and took him to hospital.  Reportedly, the immediate provocation was that his family's electricity had been left cut off by Sonelgaz even after he scraped together the money to pay the bill.
 K. L. (26 years old), inside the tribunal of Ras El Oued near Bordj Bou Arreridj, after the authorities refused to return his motorcycle which was confiscated after an accident; he was stopped quickly, and survived with only light burns.

The Ministry of Religious Affairs responded to this wave of self-immolations by devoting the Friday sermons of 21 January to admonitions of patience and reminders that suicide is forbidden in Islam.  However, some cases continued to be reported over coming days:

 23 January:
 A teenager in Oued Taourrira near Sidi Bel Abbes set himself on fire, apparently following a family altercation.
 25 January:
 Kamel Bouria (38-year-old fireman, father of one), in Oum El Bouaghi, set himself on fire following workplace difficulties.  Another fireman at the same station, Karim Mehanaine, had threatened to do the same some days earlier, but been dissuaded.
 26 January:
 A young man (26–28 years old, unemployed) in front of the wilaya seat at Djelfa, who shouted "Hagrouni" (They have wronged me) as he burned; said to have been protesting exclusion from the housing list
 28 January:
 Abdelhafid Boudechicha (destitute 29-year-old day labourer living with his parents and five siblings), at Medjana, who shouted repeatedly "I'm fed up!" then asked his mother's forgiveness - died the next day of his burns.  Said by his friends to have despaired of ever finding a job or housing.
 29 January:
 B. S. (29 years old, son of an entrepreneur from Aachacha), in front of Mohamed Khemisti High School next to the wilaya seat at Mostaganem - suffered third-degree burns.  According to security forces, this was related to disappointment in love.
 30 January:
 A Local Development Bank security guard at Staoueli (Algiers) attempted to burn himself in the course of a protest by bank workers against the bank's director.
 S. Hakimi (about 30 years old, working at the water company ADE) - sprinkled himself with petrol at ADE's director's office in Tizi Ouzou but was stopped from setting himself alight, apparently protesting an arbitrary transfer.
 6 February:
 At a protest called for by the National Committee for the Rights of the Unemployed, a young man with a job as a security guard on 6000 dinars a month drenches himself in petrol, but is stopped before managing to light a match.
 9 February:
 A 25-year-old man from Chrea near Tebessa sets himself on fire in protest of police's failure to respond to his complaint of having been beaten up; he is taken to hospital badly injured.

 18 February:
 A married man threatens to set himself on fire at the daira office of Sidi M'hamed (Algiers), but is dissuaded, and instead got to see the governor, Rabah Mokdad, about his housing problems.
 21 February:
 Three fathers formerly working at Socothyd (a cotton factory), M. Ahmed, K. Sadek et S. Farid, between 35 and 43 years old, attempt to set themselves on fire in Issers near Boumerdes, after their requests to return to the jobs they had been fired from in 2006 were rejected.  They had been fired in the wake of a strike campaign against the privatisation of the factory. They were stopped with some injuries and taken to hospital.
 4 October
A 19-year-old, who was refused permission to resit the Baccalaureat exam at his former secondary school in Oran
 8 October
 An Algerian woman who had been evicted from her flat in Oran died after setting herself and her three-year-old son on fire. She had been evicted from her flat, for which she had recently paid her life savings.

See also
 Self-immolations in Tunisia
 2013 Bulgarian self-immolations

References

Protests in Algeria
Algeria
Self-Immolations
2011 in Algeria
Self-Immolations
2011 disasters in Algeria